Melanophyllum is a genus of fungi in the family Agaricaceae. The widespread genus contains four species.

See also
List of Agaricaceae genera
List of Agaricales genera

References

Agaricaceae
Agaricales genera
Taxa named by Josef Velenovský

lt:Kelmenis